East Lexington is a census-designated place in Rockbridge County, Virginia. The population at the 2010 Census was 1,463.

References

Census-designated places in Rockbridge County, Virginia
Census-designated places in Virginia